Jesus Rosario Sablan (born April 16, 1952) is a Northern Mariana Islander politician who served as the fifth lieutenant governor of the Northern Mariana Islands from January 12, 1998 to January 14, 2002, under former Governor Pedro Tenorio.

Sablan ran as a Republican candidate for governor in the 2001 gubernatorial election. However, he was defeated in the Republican primary election by Juan Babauta, who went on to win the general election in November 2001. Though some observers expected Sablan to pursue a campaign for governor as an independent or a write-in candidate, Sablan ultimately withdrew from the race after the Republican primary.

References

1952 births
Lieutenant Governors of the Northern Mariana Islands
Living people
Republican Party (Northern Mariana Islands) politicians